Keith Hobbs may refer to:

Keith Hobbs (footballer), association football player from New Zealand
Keith Hobbs (politician) (born 1952), politician in Canada
Keith Hobbs (priest) (1925–2001), Archdeacon of Chichester